Steven Rick Ruben Goma (born 15 November 2001) is a French professional footballer who plays as a forward. Goma grew up in France, at US Roissy and Bussy-Saint-Georges and at senior level, he also played for Pandurii Târgu Jiu.

References

External links
 

2001 births
Living people
People from Île-de-France
French footballers
Association football forwards
Liga I players
Liga II players
CS Pandurii Târgu Jiu players
LPS HD Clinceni players
French expatriate footballers
Expatriate footballers in Romania
French expatriate sportspeople in Romania